The 2016–17 Hartford Hawks men's basketball team  represented the University of Hartford during the 2016–17 NCAA Division I men's basketball season. The Hawks, led by seventh-year head coach John Gallagher, played their home games at the Chase Arena at Reich Family Pavilion as members of the America East Conference. They finished the season 9–22, 4–12 in America East play to finish in seventh place. They lost in the quarterfinals of the America East tournament to Albany.

Previous season
The Hawks finished the 2015–16 season 10–23, 4–12 in America East play to finish in a tie for seventh place. They defeated Albany in the quarterfinals of the American East tournament to advance to the semifinals where they lost to Stony Brook.

Preseason 
Hartford was picked to finish eighth in the preseason America East poll.

Departures

Incoming Transfers

2016 incoming recruits
Hartford did not have any incoming players in the 2016 recruiting class.

Roster

Schedule and results

|-
!colspan=9 style=| Non-conference regular season

|-
!colspan=9 style=| America East regular season

|-
!colspan=9 style=| America East tournament

References

Hartford Hawks men's basketball seasons
Hartford
Hartford Hawks men's b
Hartford Hawks men's b